Marek Leśniewski (born 24 April 1963) is a Polish former racing cyclist. He won the silver medal in the team time trial at the 1988 Summer Olympics along with Andrzej Sypytkowski, Joachim Halupczok and Zenon Jaskuła. He won the Tour de Pologne 1985.

References

External links

1963 births
Living people
Polish male cyclists
Cyclists at the 1988 Summer Olympics
Cyclists at the 1992 Summer Olympics
Olympic cyclists of Poland
Olympic silver medalists for Poland
Olympic medalists in cycling
Sportspeople from Bydgoszcz
Medalists at the 1988 Summer Olympics